Antonio Felicité (born 25 July 1974) is a Mauritian judoka. He competed in the men's half-heavyweight event at the 1996 Summer Olympics.

References

External links
 

1974 births
Living people
Mauritian male judoka
Olympic judoka of Mauritius
Judoka at the 1996 Summer Olympics
Place of birth missing (living people)
Commonwealth Games medallists in judo
Commonwealth Games bronze medallists for Mauritius
Judoka at the 2002 Commonwealth Games
African Games medalists in judo
Competitors at the 1995 All-Africa Games
Competitors at the 1999 All-Africa Games
Competitors at the 2003 All-Africa Games
African Games bronze medalists for Mauritius
21st-century Mauritian people
Medallists at the 2002 Commonwealth Games